"Falling Again" is a song recorded by Don Williams for his album I Believe in You. It may also refer to:
"Fallin' Again", a song by Alabama from their album Just Us
"Falling Again", a song by Lacuna Coil from the album In a Reverie